Nakina railway station is located in the community of Nakina, Ontario, Canada. It was established in 1914. This station is currently in use by Via Rail. Transcontinental Canadian trains stop here.

References

External links
 
 Nakina railway station

Via Rail stations in Ontario
Railway stations in Thunder Bay District
Designated heritage railway stations in Ontario
Railway stations in Canada opened in 1914
1914 establishments in Ontario
Canadian National Railway stations in Ontario